The Ministry of Justice is an Algerian government ministry. Its headquarters is in El-Biar, Algiers.

List of ministers 

 Amar Bentoumi (1962-1963)
Mohamed El Hadi Hadj Smain (1963-1964)
Mohamed Bedjaoui (1964-1970)
Boualem Benhamouda (1972-1976)
Abdelmalek Benhabyles (1977-1978)
Lahcène Soufi (1979-1980)
 Boualem Baki (1980-1986)
Mohamed Cherif Kherroubi (1986-1988)
Ali Benflis (1989-1991)
Hamdani Benkhelil (1992)
Abdelhamid Mahi Bahi (1992)
Mohamed Tegula (1993-1996)
Mohamed Adami (1996-1998)
El Ghouti Mekamcha (1999)
Ahmed Ouyahia (2000-2002)
Mohamed Charfi (2002-2003)
Tayeb Belaiz (2003-2012)
Ahmed Noui (2012)
Mohamed Charfi (2012-2013)
Tayeb Louh (2013-2019)
Belkacem Zeghmati (2019-2021)
Abdul Rashid Tabbi(2021–present)

See also

Justice ministry
Ministère de la Justice (Algérie)
Politics of Algeria

References

External links
Official website 
Official website 

Algeria
Justice